Haubold is a surname. Notable people with the surname include:

Frank Haubold (1906–1985), American gymnast
Irma Haubold (1908–1996), American gymnast, wife of Frank
Olaf Schubert, (born Michael Haubold in 1967), German comedian and musician

See also
Harbold